P.T. Walkley is a New York City-based singer-songwriter and composer for film and television. He and his live band have opened for Weezer (at Hammerstein Ballroom) and Coldplay (at Madison Square Garden), and have played at music festivals such as All Points West. He released his first LP as a solo artist, Mr. Macy Wakes Alone, in January 2009, and includes contributions from artists such as Larry Campbell, David Campbell, and Sean Lennon. Walkley has since released two EPs, What's What and The Ghost of Chivalry. Walkley is also part of the musical project The Blue Jackets.

Walkley has also scored and written songs for several major motion pictures, including the Edward Burns films Looking for Kitty, The Groomsmen, Purple Violets, and Nice Guy Johnny, as well as the 2005 film Southern Belles, which starred Anna Faris and Judah Friedlander. Walkley has also composed and licensed music for numerous national advertising campaigns, for clients such as MasterCard, General Electric, Mercedes-Benz, Starbucks, and Macy's. He composed original music for the Ed Burns/Steven Spielberg TV Series "Public Morals" as well as the Nickelodeon children's television show Team Umizoomi, where he also provides vocals for UmiCar. In 2017, he did a music video for Sesame Workshop's Sesame Studios YouTube channel, featuring digital puppet characters called "the Ziggles." In 2021, he wrote the theme song "Hey Gabby!" for Netflix's Gabby's Dollhouse.

References 
 PT Walkley » About
 Wall Street Journal:  PT Walkley, As Heard On TV... Jim Fusilli on Walkley's music, including new EP "The Ghost Of Chivalry"

External links 
 Official Website

Living people
Singers from New York City
American film score composers
American male film score composers
American television composers
Year of birth missing (living people)
American male singer-songwriters
Singer-songwriters from New York (state)